The 1962 Harelbeke–Antwerp–Harelbeke was the fifth edition of the E3 Harelbeke cycle race and was held on 17 March 1962. The race started and finished in Harelbeke. The race was won by André Messelis.

General classification

Notes

References

1962 in Belgian sport
1962